Braathen is a surname. Notable people with the surname include: 

Helga Braathen (1953–1982), Norwegian artistic gymnast
Kjerstin Braathen (born 1970), Norwegian business executive
Lucas Braathen (born 2000), Norwegian skier
Ludvig G. Braathen (1891–1976), Norwegian entrepreneur